Qezel Gechilu Rural District is in the Central District of Mahneshan County, Zanjan province, Iran. At the National Census of 2006, its population was 2,348 in 581 households. There were 2,180 inhabitants in 586 households at the following census of 2011. At the most recent census of 2016, the population of the rural district was 1,974 in 643 households. The largest of its 10 villages was Borun Qeshlaq, with 509 people.

References 

Mahneshan County

Rural Districts of Zanjan Province

Populated places in Zanjan Province

Populated places in Mahneshan County